Ithocritus ruber is a species of beetle in the family Cerambycidae. It was described by Frederick William Hope in 1839. It is known from India, Bangladesh, and Vietnam.

References

Petrognathini
Beetles described in 1839